Mount Ida is a mountain summit in the northern Front Range of the Rocky Mountains of North America. The mountain was probably named after Mount Ida on Crete.

See also

List of Colorado mountain summits

References

External links

			

Mountains of Rocky Mountain National Park
Mountains of Grand County, Colorado
Mountains of Larimer County, Colorado
North American 3000 m summits